Localizer performance with vertical guidance (LPV) are the highest precision GPS (WAAS enabled) aviation instrument approach procedures currently available without specialized aircrew training requirements, such as required navigation performance (RNP). Lateral guidance is equivalent to a localizer, and uses a ground-independent electronic glide path. Thus, the decision altitude, DA, can be as low as 200 feet. An LPV approach is an approach with vertical guidance, APV, to distinguish it from a precision approach, PA, or a non-precision approach, NPA. WAAS criteria includes a vertical alarm limit more than 12 m, but less than 50 m, yet an LPV does not meet the ICAO Annex 10 precision approach standard.  

Examples of receivers providing LPV capability include (from Garmin) the GTN 7xx & 6xx, GNS 480, GNS 430W & 530W, and the post 2007 Garmin G1000 with GIA 63W. Various FMS models, GNSS receivers and FMS upgrades are available from Rockwell Collins (e.g.). Most new aircraft and helicopters equipped with integrated flight decks such as Rockwell Collins ProLine (TM) 21 and ProLine Fusion (TM) are LPV-capable. In 2014, Avidyne began equipping general aviation and business aircraft with the IFD540 and IFD440 navigators incorporating a touch-screen flight management system with full LPV capability.

LPV is designed to provide  lateral and vertical accuracy 95 percent of the time. Actual performance has exceeded these levels. WAAS has never been observed to have a vertical error greater than 12 metres in its operational history.
As of September 17, 2015 the Federal Aviation Administration (FAA) has published 3,567 LPV approaches at 1,739 airports. As of October 7, 2021 the FAA has published 4,088 LPV approaches at 1,965 airports. This is greater than the number of published Category I ILS procedures.

See also
 VNAV
 LNAV
 WAAS
 EGNOS

References

External links 
 – FAA – Maximizing Airport Operations Using the Wide Area Augmentation System
 – Garmin Receives WAAS Certification for GNS 400W/500W Series
 – FAA's Production Plan for IFR Procedures
 – FAA LPV Approaches

Aircraft instruments
Radio navigation

es:LPV
ja:広域航法